Lyle Williams (August 23, 1942 – November 7, 2008) was an American politician who served three terms as a U.S. Representative from Ohio from 1979 to 1985.

Biography
Williams was born in Philippi, West Virginia to Dale and Frankie (Ice) Williams. He attended the public schools of North Bloomfield, Ohio, graduating from Bloomfield High School in 1960. He served in the United States Army Reserve from 1960 to 1968, and worked as a barber. He married Nancie Peterson in 1964 and had four children.

Political career 
Williams began his political career as a member of the Bloomfield school board from 1970 to 1972, before he was elected a Trumbull County Commissioner, serving from 1972 to 1976. He was elected a Republican to the Ninety-sixth Congress in 1978, narrowly defeating incumbent Democrat Charles J. Carney in a heavily Democratic working class district that included the industrial cities of Youngstown and Warren. He was reelected in 1980, defeating state Senator Harry Meshel, and in 1982 over George D. Tablack. He was defeated for reelection in 1984 by Mahoning County Sheriff James Traficant.

After Congress 
After leaving Congress, Williams worked on the external affairs staff of the Office of Surface Mining in the U.S. Department of the Interior, beginning in 1987. He ran unsuccessfully for nomination to the One Hundred Third, One Hundred Eighth, and One Hundred Ninth Congresses.

Death
Williams died of a heart attack in Lordstown, Ohio, on November 7, 2008.

References

External links

1942 births
2008 deaths
20th-century American politicians
County commissioners in Ohio
Military personnel from Ohio
People from Philippi, West Virginia
Politicians from Warren, Ohio
School board members in Ohio
United States Army reservists
United States Department of the Interior officials
Republican Party members of the United States House of Representatives from Ohio